The brown dwarf gecko (Lepidoblepharis festae), also known commonly as the Amazonian scaly-eyed gecko, is a species of lizard in the family Sphaerodactylidae. The species is endemic to north-western South America.

Etymology
The specific name, festae, is in honor of Italian zoologist Enrico Festa.

Geographic range
L. festae is found in Colombia, Ecuador, and Peru.

Reproduction
L. festae is oviparous.

References

Further reading
Peracca MG (1897). "Viaggio del Dr. Enrico Festa nell'Ecuador e regioni vicine. IV. ". Bollettino dei Musei di Zoologia ed Anatomia comparata della R[egia] Università di Torino 12 (300): 1-20. (Lepidodactylus festae, new species, pp. 2–3). (in Italian).
Vanzolini P (1953). "Sobre a presença do genero Lepidoblepharis no Brasil (Sauria, Gekkonidae)". Papéis Avulsos de Zoologia, São Paulo 11 (14/15): 225–270. (Lepidoblepharis festae, new combination, p. 265). (in Portuguese).

Lepidoblepharis
Reptiles of Colombia
Reptiles of Ecuador
Reptiles of Peru
Reptiles described in 1897
Taxa named by Mario Giacinto Peracca